TV4 News was a Swedish television channel owned and operated by the TV4 Group. It started broadcasting on 24 January 2012 as Sweden's first 24/7 news channel in the Swedish language, with some material from BBC World News also rebroadcast on the said channel.

In May 2013, TV4 Group announced that TV4 News will close down as it was not expected to become profitable. TV4 News stopped broadcasting on 31 August 2013.

References

External links 
 

TV4 AB
Defunct television channels in Sweden
Television channels and stations established in 2012
Television channels and stations disestablished in 2013